Edible Brooklyn is a Brooklyn-based food magazine and website that covers local food and drink culture, restaurants, ethnic eats, farmers markets, food-related events and articles on such topics as a live poultry market in Williamsburg, and which features recommendations in items like "Late Night Nosh." The magazine also hosts regular events such as Brooklyn Uncorked and Good Spirits Brooklyn as well as short videos and interviews called Edible Films. The publication received a James Beard Foundation Award in 2010 for its food-related columns. Editor Rachel Wharton authored Edible Brooklyn: The Cookbook in 2011.

The magazine is published five times a year and available online, through subscription or for free at selected Brooklyn retailers Edible Brooklyn is part of the Edible Communities network and has subscribers in all 50 states and distributed in several Barnes & Noble stores. Brian Halweil and Stephen Munshin launched the magazine in 2006. They also established sister publications: Edible Manhattan and Edible East End and Edible Long Island.  

The first issue debuted in May 2006 and included articles about smoked fish in Greenpoint, John Flansburgh of They Might Be Giants, Jacques Torres Chocolates, and Gomberg Seltzer Works, one of the last remaining seltzer delivery companies in Brooklyn.

Edible Brooklyn hosts numerous annual events such as Good Beer and Brooklyn Uncorked. The first annual Good Spirits Brooklyn event was hosted by Edible Brooklyn at The Invisible Dog Art Center in 2015. Other Edible Brooklyn events have included series affiliated with Brooklyn Brewery such as Sell It Like It Is, Demystifying the CSA Movement, and The Big Smoke, an event featuring smoked meats hosted at Brooklyn Brewery, as well as events like Brooklyn's Bounty which was hosted by Travel Channel's Adam Richman.

References

Food and drink magazines
Magazines established in 2006
Magazines published in New York City
Quarterly magazines published in the United States